OEDN is an OpenCable Application Platform (OCAP) EBIF Developer Network that was founded in October, 2007. It is an online developer network for the promotion of Interactive Television application and service development on digital cable television.  
 
The goal of the network is to support the emerging and long-term needs of software engineers and product teams who are building OCAP (tru2way) and EBIF applications. The goal is to run it not only on digital cable television, but also converged applications and services spanning mobile and broadband devices.

OEDN.net is a networked Community of Practice with a membership constituency drawn from cable companies, ITV application vendors, content providers, programming networks, advertisers, academic interactive media researchers and independent consultants.

References

External links 
 OpenCable Platform Developer Community within the Mobile & Embedded project on Java.net
 
 
 
 Sun Microsystems' Java TV

Cable television in the United States
Interactive television
Software developer communities